Garin Lee Veris (born February 27, 1963 in Chillicothe, Ohio) is a former American football defensive end in the National Football League, mainly for the New England Patriots.

Veris graduated from Chillicothe High School, where he starred in football (playing offense and defense) and basketball in 1981. Veris also starred in track and field, winning the OHSAA Class AAA shot put and discus throw titles in 1980,then repeating in each event as champion in 1981. After high school, Veris went on to Stanford University where he had an outstanding performance which culminated in his induction into the Stanford University Athletics Hall of Fame.  Veris was on the Stanford football team during the 1982 game against Cal where Cal won the game on a final play known as The Play.  He was taken in the second round of the 1985 NFL draft by the New England Patriots. During his rookie season, he recorded 14 sacks—including four in the playoffs—and started in Super Bowl XX, where his team lost to the Chicago Bears. He finished his career in 1992 with the San Francisco 49ers and later was named to the Patriots' All-1980s team.

Since March 5, 2013, Veris has worked as the director of external business development & marketing for UMass Boston Athletics.

He was athletic director at Massachusetts Maritime Academy from November 2015 until March 2018.

Veris served as the athletic director and at-risk coordinator at his alma mater Chillicothe High School in Chillicothe, Ohio in 2011–2012.  He previously served as the AD at Haverhill High School in Haverhill, Massachusetts in 2009–2010.

In popular culture
Veris was featured in the Family Guy episode "Run, Chris, Run" as the character Glenn Quagmire is trying to unsuccessfully use to tackle Bo Jackson with in the game Tecmo Super Bowl. Veris was listed as a teammate of Ronnie Lott in the game for the 49ers in a somewhat anachronistic move, as Lott was playing for the Los Angeles Raiders by the time Veris was playing for the 49ers and Jackson was out of the NFL due to his devastating hip injury two years before.

References

External links
Garin Veris player card
Garin Veris New England Patriots Biography
http://www.ccsd.us/

1963 births
Living people
Sportspeople from Chillicothe, Ohio
American football defensive ends
Stanford Cardinal football players
New England Patriots players
San Francisco 49ers players
Ed Block Courage Award recipients